Supernatural Science is a BBC Television documentary series that explores supernatural phenomena to determine whether or not there is a scientific explanation.

Production
The series was co-produced with the Discovery Channel.

Episodes

Season one (1999)

Season two (2000)

References

External links 
 

BBC television documentaries about science
1999 British television series debuts
2000 British television series endings
1999 in science
2000 in science